born August 4, 1981, in Anjo, Aichi, is a Japanese judoka. She was coached by Toshihiko Koga, who is a gold medalist at the Barcelona 
Olympics and a silver medalist at the Atlanta Olympics Men's Judo.
Tanimoto won the Women's -63 kg category gold medal at the Athens Olympics in 2004 and at the Beijing Olympics in 2008.

In September 2005, she won the silver medal at the World judo championship games in Cairo, Egypt.

Retirement
Tanimoto retired from competitive judo in September 2010. In 2015, she became the assistant manager of Komatsu's judo club.  For the Rio 2016 Olympics, she was a coach for the women's judo team.  She is completing a postgraduate degree at Hirosaki University, and listed as a women's junior coach for the All Japan Judo Federation.  Additionally, she was a board member of the Tokyo 2020 Organizing Committee.

See also 
 List of Olympic medalists in judo

References

External links
 

 Videos of Ayumi Tanimoto (judovision.org)

1981 births
Living people
People from Anjō
Japanese female judoka
Judoka at the 2004 Summer Olympics
Judoka at the 2008 Summer Olympics
Olympic judoka of Japan
Olympic gold medalists for Japan
Sportspeople from Aichi Prefecture
University of Tsukuba alumni
Olympic medalists in judo
Asian Games medalists in judo
Medalists at the 2008 Summer Olympics
Medalists at the 2004 Summer Olympics
Judoka at the 2002 Asian Games
Judoka at the 2006 Asian Games
Komatsu Limited
Asian Games gold medalists for Japan
Asian Games bronze medalists for Japan
Medalists at the 2002 Asian Games
Medalists at the 2006 Asian Games
21st-century Japanese women